Artyom Aleksandrovich Petrenko (born 18 February 1986) is a former Russian professional football player.

Club career
He played in the Russian Football National League for FC Lada Togliatti in 2003.

External links
 
 

1986 births
Sportspeople from Rostov-on-Don
Living people
Russian footballers
Association football midfielders
FC Lada-Tolyatti players
FC Chernomorets Novorossiysk players
FC Nistru Otaci players
FC Metallurg Lipetsk players
FC Neftekhimik Nizhnekamsk players
FC Tyumen players
FC Dynamo Stavropol players
FC SKA Rostov-on-Don players
FC Istiklol players
FC Taganrog players
FC Dynamo Kirov players
Moldovan Super Liga players
Tajikistan Higher League players
Russian expatriate footballers
Expatriate footballers in Moldova
Expatriate footballers in Tajikistan
Russian expatriate sportspeople in Tajikistan
Russian expatriate sportspeople in Moldova